Forrest Floyd "Twogie" Twogood (April 29, 1907 – April 26, 1972) was a minor league baseball player, college basketball and baseball coach, and college athletics administrator. He is best known as the head basketball coach at the University of Southern California for 16 seasons, from 1950 to 1966.

Born in Kingsley, Iowa, Twogood was three-sport athlete at Central High School in Sioux City, then played basketball and baseball at the University of Iowa, before being signed in baseball by Branch Rickey's St. Louis Cardinals. A left-handed pitcher, he played four seasons of minor league baseball while spending his winters in Los Angeles as an assistant basketball coach at USC under Sam Barry, his coach at Iowa, from 1929 to 1936.

After arm trouble led to his retirement from baseball in 1934, Twogood was the basketball head coach at the University of Idaho in Moscow, Idaho from 1936 to 1941, (and also the Vandals' baseball coach (1937–41)), and the University of San Francisco for a season  

During World War II, he served in the U.S. Navy, then worked in the private sector and also as supervisor of officials in the Pacific Coast Conference.

Twogood returned to USC as an assistant basketball coach under Barry in 1949, and when Barry died of a heart attack in September 1950, Twogood was promoted to head coach, and served for 16 seasons.  In 22 seasons as a head coach, he compiled a  record, with two conference championships and three NCAA tournament appearances, including the Final Four in 1954.  After stepping down from coaching in 1966, Twogood was an assistant athletic director at USC. The auditorium at the university's Heritage Hall is named in his honor; its bronze plaque reads:

Diagnosed with inoperable lymph gland cancer in late 1971, Twogood died in April 1972 at Glendale Memorial Hospital in the Los Angeles suburb of Glendale, a few days shy of his 65th birthday.  He left behind his beloved wife Eleanor, sisters Blanche and Lucille, and several nieces and nephews Dick Evans and David Stockman, US Naval Academy 1951 Col (Ret) USAF and fighter pilot, and wife Lucia, as well as David and Lucia's children Sidne Ann and Bill Stockman, who loved him dearly

Head coaching record

Basketball

See also
 List of NCAA Division I Men's Final Four appearances by coach

References

External links
 Pac-12 Hall of Honor – Forrest Twogood
 BaseballReference – Forrest Twogood
 University of Iowa Libraries – photo of Forrest Twogood
 

1907 births
1972 deaths
American men's basketball coaches
American men's basketball players
Baseball pitchers
Baseball players from Iowa
Basketball coaches from Iowa
Basketball players from Iowa
Danville Veterans players
Idaho Vandals baseball coaches
Idaho Vandals men's basketball coaches
Iowa Hawkeyes baseball players
Iowa Hawkeyes men's basketball players
San Francisco Dons men's basketball coaches
Shawnee Robins players
Sportspeople from Sioux City, Iowa
St. Joseph Saints players
Toledo Mud Hens players
USC Trojans men's basketball coaches